Stephan Markus Cabizares Schröck (born 21 August 1986) is a professional footballer who plays as an attacking midfielder for the Azkals Development Team of the Philippines Football League. Although primarily a midfielder, earlier in his career he played mostly as a winger.

Born to a German father and Filipino mother, Schröck was a youth international for Germany, but switched to the Philippines at the senior level. He began his professional career in Germany with Greuther Fürth and was part of the squad that won the 2011–12 2. Bundesliga. He then played in the Bundesliga with 1899 Hoffenheim and Eintracht Frankfurt before returning to Greuther Fürth in 2014. He joined Filipino club Ceres (later United City) on loan in 2016, with a permanent transfer taking place the following season. Schröck helped Ceres/United City win four consecutive Philippines Football League titles from 2017 to 2020, and received the Golden Ball award in the last two seasons.

Schröck made his debut for the Philippines in 2011 and captained the team from 2019 until his international retirement in 2023.

Early life
Schröck was born on 21 August 1986 in Schweinfurt, West Germany to a German father and a Filipina mother. His mother is from Parang, Maguindanao but grew up in Cebu.

Schröck's parents separated when he was six years old, leaving him and sister with his mother. His mother had to simultaneously do two to three jobs in order to support their family. Growing up in Schweinfurt, Schröck turned to football as a means to cope with their difficult situation. Prior to taking up football, Schröck tried boxing since his father was a boxer.

Club career

Greuther Fürth
Schröck started at SpVgg Greuther Fürth in 2001, going through the junior teams and made the leap into the professional squad in the 2004–05 season. In April 2008, Schröck signed a two-year contract extension with Greuther Fürth. Two years later, in March 2010, Schröck again extended his contract for another two years. Although he revealed that he could have gone to five other clubs with better financial benefits, he chose to stay to repay the backing that the club has always shown him. He also wanted to reach the Bundesliga with the club and believed it would be an achievable target before his contract expired. In the 2011–12 season, his final year at the club, he helped the team win the league title and gain promotion to the Bundesliga.

1899 Hoffenheim
In late March 2012, Schröck signed a three-year deal with Bundesliga side TSG 1899 Hoffenheim. He made his debut in a 4–0 home defeat to Eintracht Frankfurt but was sent off after 74 minutes. Schröck started and put up a great performance against league leaders Bayern Munich on 3 March 2013. He came as close as anyone to scoring for Hoffenheim with a lovely shot which Starke saved well.

Eintracht Frankfurt
On 27 June 2013, Bundesliga club Eintracht Frankfurt announced that they had signed Schröck on a two-year deal. He made his debut against champions FC Bayern Munich and was charged with marking Franck Ribéry.
Schröck scored his first goal for Frankfurt in a Europa League match against APOEL Nicosia.

Return to Greuther Fürth
After only a season with Frankfurt, Schröck returned to Greuther Fürth. However, in January 2016, it is reported that Fürth has allowed Schröck to look for a new club excusing him from two weeks of training. He is set to leave the club and prematurely end his contract. Schröck wanted to play as an attacking midfielder instead of a right back, however the position is contested among other players of the club such as Sebastian Freis.

On 15 April 2017, Greuther Fürth and Schröck reported having mutually agreed to release Schröck, as confirmed by an official post by the club on its website and Schröck himself through a Facebook post.

Loan to Ceres
On 13 January 2016, United Football League side, Ceres F.C. announced that they have signed Schröck to play for the club on a loan basis at least until August. Ceres' rival, Global F.C. reportedly tried to get Schröck to play for them.

Schröck made his UFL debut for Ceres at the 2016 UFL Cup in a 2–1 win over Loyola Meralco Sparks F.C. Schröck was played as a winger in the front but did not score a single goal despite his numerous attempts. Prior to his Ceres stint, he is often played as a midfielder or defender while playing in Germany. Ceres coach Ali Go remarked that the club is still exploring what position is the best for Schröck adding that with a few more games, the footballer would get used to the Philippine and Asian-style of play.

Schröck's loan agreement to Ceres which was originally to be ended in August was extended until January 2017.

Ceres–Negros / United City
Schröck returned to Ceres, which renamed themselves as Ceres–Negros when they joined the Philippines Football League (PFL). The move was announced by the club on 27 April 2017, and Schröck went on to become a key player of Ceres–Negros helping them clinch three straight PFL titles and one trophy in the Copa Paulino Alcantara.

Ceres–Negros underwent a change in management and was reorganized as United City F.C. when MMC Sportz Asia took over the club. The new management had to secure Schröck's continued service with the club. Schröck has also received offers from clubs outside the Philippines which reportedly include Bundesliga side, TSG 1899 Hoffenheim and sides from Thailand and South Korea. On 28 July 2020, it was announced that Schröck would remain in the newly renamed club and was also designated captain and playing assistant coach.

Due to logistical issues caused by the COVID-19 pandemic in mid-2020, Schröck was left stranded in Germany where he joined TV Königsberg, a lower division club, as a guest player in order to maintain his fitness. He was able to return to the Philippines by October 2020.

On 26 June 2021, he scored his and the club's first-ever AFC Champions League goal in their first-ever match in the tournament, a 1–1 draw against Beijing Guoan.

In March 2022, after a 5-year stint with the club, Schröck and United City mutually agreed on the termination his contract.

ADT
Schröck moved to the Azkals Development Team for the 2022–23 PFL season which kicked off in August 2022. A veteran among the roster filled with prospect national team players, Schröck was named captain of the club. He is also made part of ADT's coaching staff led by coach Norman Fegidero. He is planning to set up the Azkals Development Academy, which will be affiliated with the club.

International career

Schröck was born to a German father and a Filipina mother, making him eligible to represent Germany or the Philippines at the international level. He initially chose Germany, as he has represented the country at U-18, U-19 and U-20 levels.

Under previous FIFA statutes, Schröck could have switched to the Philippines until his 21st birthday but he didn't take that option, neither was he called up during this time. In early October 2008, the Philippine Football Federation wanted to get him to play for the Philippines in 2008 AFF Championship qualification tournament. However, he was not able to as he was already over the age of 21. FIFA eventually removed the age limit on players switching nations in early June 2009, making him eligible again to switch to the Philippines. In July 2010, Schröck announced his intention to play for the Philippines in the 2010 AFF Championship qualification tournament in Laos, but was ultimately left out of the squad as his documents had not been processed in time.

2014 FIFA World Cup qualifiers

It was only in March 2011 where he went to the Philippines to finalize his documents and was tipped to be ready for the 2014 FIFA World Cup qualification first round. He eventually made his full international debut for the Philippines in the first leg of the first round of the World Cup qualifiers on 29 June 2011 against Sri Lanka, playing the full 90 minutes in a 1–1 draw and also receiving a yellow card. In the second leg on 3 July 2011, he again played the full 90 minutes in a 4–0 win. However, he received another yellow card and was suspended along with team captain Alexander Borromeo for the first-leg of the second round qualifiers against Kuwait. The Philippine Football Federation appealed to FIFA to rescind his suspension, but was unsuccessful.

Without Schröck, the Philippines lost 3–0 to Kuwait in the first-leg. Believing the deficit could be overturned, he came back for the second leg against the wishes of his club. He would score the opening goal from 25 yards deep into the first half injury time, but was not enough to help the Philippines make a comeback as they eventually lost 2–1.

2014 AFC Challenge Cup
Schröck scored his second international goal less than a minute into the second half of the 2014 AFC Challenge Cup qualifier against Cambodia. The Philippines would go on to win 8–0. Two days later, he was awarded by the Asian Football Confederation (AFC) as the MVP in the 1–0 win over Turkmenistan, helping the Philippines qualify for the 2014 AFC Challenge Cup.

On 4 August 2014, Schröck announced he was "resigning" from the Philippines national team, effectively announcing his international retirement to "pursue new challenges". He then revealed that he resigned as a protest against coach Thomas Dooley and was effectively giving an ultimatum, saying he would no longer play for the country while Dooley remained coach. Schröck went on to criticize the team management, claiming there were internal problems in the Philippine Football Federation and labelled the team a "chicken farm", a German expression meaning highly disorganized, before saying he felt the veteran players were not being respected.

The dispute seemed to have been finally settled on 10 March 2015, when reports indicated that Schröck had apologized to Dooley. This was later confirmed by the player on his official Facebook page.

On 12 November 2015, he played his first game for the team as captain against Yemen. Schröck's relationship with Dooley worsened after the 2016 AFF Championship and he never received a call up to the national team for the rest of Dooley's tenure as coach which lasted until 2018.

2019 AFC Asian Cup 
Schröck received a call up to the Philippine national team for a training camp in Bahrain under new head coach, Scott Cooper and was part of the squad that played in the 2018 AFF Championship where the Philippines mentored by Sven-Göran Eriksson finished as semifinalists for the fourth time.

He also played in the 2019 AFC Asian Cup as captain of the team. The Philippines lost all three of their matches. The Philippines' lone goal at the tournament was scored by Schröck in the last match against Kyrgyzstan. It was scored from a far away free kick; the ball was meant to be head-butted in but no player reached it- and to the goalie's surprise- it bounced and made it into the back of the net.

After the AFC Asian Cup, Schröck expressed his intention to retire from the national team citing his age and plans to focus with his family and club career. Schröck would continue to play for the national team, featuring for the Philippines at the 2020 AFF Championship in December 2021.

2019 Southeast Asian Games
In late November 2019, Schröck was subsequently one of the two over-age players to be included in the Philippines U-22 squad for the 2019 Southeast Asian Games, hosted by the Philippines.

2021 Southeast Asian Games
Schröck was named as one of the over-aged players for the Philippines under-23 team at the 31st Southeast Asian Games, which was held in Vietnam.

2022 AFF Championship
Schröck was called up to the national team for the 2022 AFF Championship tournament. He was the oldest outfield player in the tournament, at the age of 36. With his team eliminated early from the group stage, Schröck announced the tournament would be his last appearance for the national team. His final match was against Indonesia on 2 January 2023, where he provided an assist for Sebastian Rasmussen in a 2–1 defeat.

Personal life
On 28 May 2011, Schröck married Pina in Germany, whom he knew since childhood.

Career statistics 
 Scores and results list the Philippine's goal tally first, score column indicates score after each Schröck goal.

Honours
Greuther Fürth
 2. Bundesliga: 2011–12
Ceres-Negros/United City
 Philippines Football League: 2017, 2018, 2019, 2020
 Copa Paulino Alcantara: 2019
 United Football League Cup runner-up: 2016

Philippines
 AFC Challenge Cup runner-up: 2014

Individual
 Philippine Sportswriters Association Footballer of the Year (Mr. Football Award): 2013, 2019
 Philippines Football League Golden Ball: 2019, 2020
 ASEAN Football Federation Best XI: 2019

References

External links
 
 
 
 

Living people
1986 births
People from Schweinfurt
Sportspeople from Lower Franconia
Citizens of the Philippines through descent
German sportspeople of Filipino descent
German footballers
Germany youth international footballers
Filipino footballers
Filipino expatriate footballers
Philippines international footballers
Association football fullbacks
Association football midfielders
Bundesliga players
2. Bundesliga players
SpVgg Greuther Fürth players
TSG 1899 Hoffenheim players
Eintracht Frankfurt players
Ceres–Negros F.C. players
Footballers from Bavaria
2019 AFC Asian Cup players
Competitors at the 2019 Southeast Asian Games
Competitors at the 2021 Southeast Asian Games
Southeast Asian Games competitors for the Philippines